Jess Simpson (born August 21, 1970) is an American football coach who is the current co-defensive coordinator and defensive line coach for Duke University. He was previously the defensive line coach for the University of Miami. Prior to coaching at Miami, he spent most of his career as the head coach of Buford High School in Buford, Georgia.

References

External links
 Auburn profile
 Miami profile
 Duke profile
 247sports.com profile
 

1970 births
Living people
American football tight ends
Players of American football from Marietta, Georgia
Auburn Tigers football players
Coaches of American football from Georgia (U.S. state)
Auburn Tigers football coaches
High school football coaches in Georgia (U.S. state)
Georgia State Panthers football coaches
Atlanta Falcons coaches
Miami Hurricanes football coaches
Duke Blue Devils football coaches